138 may refer to:

138 (number)
138 BC
AD 138
138 (New Jersey bus)